The following is a list of Jewish heads of state and/or government in the Land of Israel.

House of Saul
 King Saul (c. 1079–1007 BCE)
 King Ish-bosheth (II Samuel 2:8–9)

House of David
 King David (II Samuel 5:3) c. 1004–970 BCE – who made Jerusalem the capital of the United Kingdom of Israel.
 King Solomon (I Kings 2:12)
 King Rehoboam (I Kings 11:43)

After Rehoboam
After Rehoboam reigned three years (1 Chronicles 11:17), the kingdom was divided in two – the northern kingdom of Israel under Jeroboam, with its capital, first in Shechem (Nablus), then Tirzah, and finally Samaria, and ruled by a series of dynasties beginning with Jeroboam; and the southern kingdom of Judah with its capital still at Jerusalem and still ruled by the House of David. The following list contains the kings of Judah with the kings of Israel in the summaries. See also: the dynasties of the northern kingdom of Israel.
 King Abijam (I Kings 14:31) c. 915–913 BCE
 King Asa (I Kings 15:8) – under whose reign, the following were kings in Israel: Nadab, Baasha, Elah, Zimri, Omri, and Ahab.
 King Jehoshaphat (I Kings 15:24) – under whose reign, Ahaziah and Jehoram reigned in Israel.
 King Jehoram ben Jehoshaphat (I Kings 22:50)
 King Ahaziah ben Jehoram (II Kings 8:24) – under whose reign, Jehu ruled in Israel.
 Queen Athaliah (II Kings 11:3) mother of Ahaziah
 King Jehoash (II Kings 11:21) – son of Ahaziah, under whose reign, Jehoahaz and another Jehoash ruled in Israel.
 King Amaziah (II Kings 14:1) – under whose reign, Jeroboam II ruled in Israel.
 King Uzziah referred to as Azariah (II Kings 15:1) – under whose reign, the following ruled over Israel: Zachariah, Shallum, Menahem, Pekahiah, and Pekah.
 King Jotham (II Kings 15:32)
 King Ahaz (II Kings 16:1) – under whose reign, Hoshea ruled as the last king of Israel.
 King Hezekiah (II Kings 18:1) – under his reign, the Assyrian Empire conquered and destroyed the northern kingdom 722 BCE leaving only the southern kingdom of Judah.
 King Manasseh (II Kings 20:21)
 King Amon (II Kings 21:18)
 King Josiah (II Kings 21:26)
 King Jehoahaz (II Kings 23:30) son of Josiah
 King Jehoiakim (II Kings 23:34) son of Josiah
 King Jeconiah (II Kings 24:6) son of Jehoiakim
 King Zedekiah (II Kings 24:17) – son of Josiah, last king to rule over, and in, Judah. Overthrown by the Chaldean Empire (which succeeded the Assyrian Empire) and exiled, along with most of the rest of the population, to that kingdom, where his 10 sons were executed in front of him, then he was blinded and imprisoned. [All thought he was released later on along with Jeconiah (who was imprisoned some 14 years before Zedekiah) when Nebuchadnezar died and was succeeded by his son Evil Moredach]
 Gedaliah (II Kings 25:22–23) son of Ahikam advisor to King Josiah; he became governor over the remnant of Judah in their homeland and was assassinated the next year [This ended all Jewish settlement in Israel for that period]

Governors of the Persian Province of Judea
 Zerubbabel (Ezra 3:8) son of Shealtiel. In the first year of the reign of Cyrus, successor to Darius, the Jews were allowed to return to their homeland. Zerubbabel led the first group of returnees and ruled in Judea for two years. The date is generally thought to have been between 538 and 520 BC. The House of David had survived, but struggled to reclaim its place as the ruling House of Israel.
 Nehemiah (Book of Nehemiah) arrived in Jerusalem in 445 as governor of Judah, appointed by Artaxerxes.
 Hananiah (Nehemiah 7:2)

Hasmonean dynasty 168–37 BCE

The Maccabees founded the Hasmonean dynasty, which ruled from 168 BCE – 37 BCE, reasserting the Jewish religion and expanding the boundaries of the Land of Israel by conquest. In the post-Maccabean period the high priest was looked upon as exercising in all things, political, legal, and sacerdotal, the supreme authority.
 Mattityahu – who began a war for independence.
 Judah – during whose reign, Alcimus succeeded Menelaeus as high priest.
 Jonathan – assumed the high priesthood.
 Simon – succeeded his brother Jonathan as high priest and was also installed as ethnarch. Under his reign, Judea gained its independence.
 John Hyrcanus I – also succeeded as ethnarch and high priest.
 Aristobulus – succeeded his father John Hyrcanus I as high priest and was also installed as king.
 Alexander Jannaeus – high priest and king.
 Salome Alexandra - reigning as queen only.
 Hyrcanus II – succeeded his father Alexander as high priest beginning with the rule of Salome. Became king upon the death of Salome.
 Aristobulus II – succeeded as high priest and king. During his reign, Judea lost its independence and passed under the rule of Rome (63 BCE) who overthrew him and reinstalled:
 Hyrcanus II as high priest only.
 Antigonus – high priest and king.

Herodian dynasty (37 BCE – 70 CE)

 King Herod the Great
 Ethnarch Herod Archelaus (4 BCE – 6 CE), ruler of Samaria, Judea, and Idumea, known as the Tetrarchy of Judea

After Archelaus and during the intervening period, the Sanhedrin, founded by Ezra, became the sole rulers of the Jewish people in Judea in conjunction with the High Priest. The heads, or nesiim, of the Sanhedrin beginning in 20 BCE, were Hillel the Elder, his son Shimon, and his son Gamaliel I whose rule extended into the reign of:

 King Agrippa I (41–44)
 King Herod of Chalcis (41–48)
 King Agrippa II (53–100). In 66 CE, the great revolt began against Rome, resulting in the Zealot Temple Siege and culminating in the destruction of the Temple in Jerusalem in 70 CE, the abolition of the High Priesthood, and the final defeat at Massada in 73 CE.

Great Sanhedrin 80–429 CE

The Patriarchate was the governing legalistic body of Judean and Galilean Jewry after the destruction of the Second Temple until about 429 CE. Being a member of the house of Hillel and thus a descendant of King David, the Patriarch, known in Hebrew as the Nasi (prince), had almost royal authority.
 Gamaliel II of Jamnia (80–115)
 Eleazar ben Azariah (115–120)
Interregnum (Bar Kokhba revolt) (132–135)
 Judah bar Ilai c. 140 moved the Sanhedrin to Usha
 Shimon ben Gamliel II
 Judah haNasi (170–220) – ruled from Bet Shearim, then Sepphoris
 Gamaliel III (220–230)
 Judah II (230–270) – ruled from Sepphoris, then Tiberias. This was the Sanhedrin's last move.
 Gamaliel IV (270–290)
 Judah III (290–320)
 Hillel II (320–365) – 320 is given as the traditional date for the codification of the Jerusalem Talmud
 Gamaliel V (365–385)
 Judah IV (385–400) – in 395, the Roman Empire split into east and west and Palestine passed under the eastern Byzantine Empire.
 Gamaliel VI (400–425) – on 17 October 415, an edict issued by the Emperors Honorius and Theodosius II deposed Gamaliel VI as nasi. Theodosius did not allow the appointment of a successor and in 429 terminated the Jewish patriarchate.

7th century
 Nehemiah ben Hushiel (615–617)

Hacham Bashi (1842–1918)
Hakham Bashi is the Ottoman Turkish name for the Chief Rabbi of the nation's Jewish community.
 Avraham Haim Gaggin (b. Turkey) 1842–1848
 Yitzhak Kovo 1848–1854
 Haim Abulafia 1854–1860
 Haim Hazzan (b. Turkey) 1860–1869
 Avraham Ashkenazi (b. Greece) 1869–1880
 Raphael Meir Panigel (b. Bulgaria) 1880–1893
 Yaakov Shaul Elyashar 1893–1906
 Yaakov Meir 1906–1907
 Eliyahu Moshe Panigel 1907–1908
 Nahman Batito 1908–1915
 Nissim Danon 1915–1918 – In 1917, Palestine was conquered by the British. Danon was succeeded as chief rabbi after World War I by Haim Moshe Elyashar who assumed the title of Acting Chief Rabbi 1918–1921. (For a list of Chief Rabbis during the Mandate and afterwards, see List of chief rabbis of Israel and Mandatory Palestine They controlled religious affairs while:

Jewish National Council (1917–1948)

The Jewish National Council (Vaad Leumi) controlled civil affairs, as defined by a British Mandatory Ordinance. The following list contains the elected chairmen of the Jewish National Council.
 Yaacov Thon (b. Ukraine) 1917–1920 – head of a provisional council which preceded the actual formation of the Vaad Leumi in 1920.
 David Yellin 1920–1929
 Pinhas Rutenberg (b. Ukraine) 1929–1931
 Yitzhak Ben Zvi (b. Ukraine) – elected as chairman in the 1931 elections, held the office until independence in 1948. In 1939, Pinhas Rutenberg was, once again, appointed chairman of the Va'ad while Ben Zvi became President. He held that position until his death in 1942. In the 1944 elections, *David Remez (b. Ukraine), was elected as chairman while ben Zvi continued with the title of President.

State of Israel 1948–present

 David Ben-Gurion (b. Russian Poland) 1948–1953, 1955–1963
 Moshe Sharett (b. Russian Ukraine) 1953–1955
 Levi Eshkol (b. Russian Ukraine) 1963–1969
 Golda Meir who came from Ukraine via the United States 1969–1974
 Yitzhak Rabin (b. Mandatory Palestine) 1974–1977, 1992–1995
 Menachem Begin (b. Russian Belarus) 1977–1983
 Yitzhak Shamir (b. Russian Poland) 1983–1984, 1986–1992
 Shimon Peres (b. Poland) 1984–1986, 1995–1996
 Ehud Barak (b. Mandatory Palestine) 1999–2001
 Ariel Sharon (b. Mandatory Palestine) 2001–2006
 Ehud Olmert (b. Mandatory Palestine) 2006–2009
 Naftali Bennett (b. Israel) 2021-2022
 Yair Lapid (b. Israel) 2022
 Benjamin Netanyahu (b. Israel) 1996–1999, 2009–2021, 2022-present

See also 
Jewish leadership
Kings of Israel and Judah

References

Jews in the Land of Israel
Jewish history timelines
Israel
Jewish leaders in the Land of Israel
Jewish
Israel